Richard John McCann (December 12, 1949 – January 24, 2021) was an American writer of fiction, nonfiction, and poetry. He lived in Washington, D.C., where he was a longtime professor in the MFA Program in Creative Writing at American University.

As a teenager, he wrote to Bette Davis, whose work he greatly admired; they shared a correspondence which he recounted in a 2016 article in the Washington Post.

A gay writer, he was the author of Mother of Sorrows, a collection of linked stories that novelist Michael Cunningham has described as unbearably beautiful. It won the 2005 John C. Zacharis First Book Award from Ploughshares and was also an American Library Association Stonewall Book Award recipient, as well as a finalist for the Lambda Literary Award. Amazon named it one of the Top 50 Books of 2005.

McCann's book of poems, Ghost Letters, won the 1994 Beatrice Hawley and Capricorn Poetry awards. With Michael Klein, he edited Things Shaped in Passing: More 'Poets for Life' Writing from the AIDS Pandemic. His stories, poems, and essays have appeared in The Atlantic, Esquire, Ms., Tin House, Ploughshares, and numerous anthologies, including The O. Henry Prize Stories 2007, Best American Essays 2000, and The Penguin Book of Gay Short Stories. He has received fellowships from the Guggenheim and Rockefeller foundations and the Yaddo Corporation. In 2010, he was the Master Artist at The Atlantic Center for the Arts in New Smyrna Beach, FL.

McCann was associated with the town of Provincetown, Massachusetts, where he lived intermittently since the 1970s and where he served on the board of trustees of the Fine Arts Work Center. He served on the board of directors of the PEN/Faulkner Foundation in Washington, D.C. and was a Member of the Corporation of Yaddo in Saratoga Springs, NY.

The Pen/Faulkner Foundation announced his death on January 25, 2021, at the age of 71.

References

External links
RichardMcCann.net
"All Things Considered" NPR interview
MFA Creative Writing program at American University
McCann's French publisher
McCann's Italian publisher
Richard McCann papers held by Special Collections, University of Delaware

1949 births
2021 deaths
American humanities academics
American male poets
American short story writers
American gay writers
Writers from Washington, D.C.
American University faculty and staff
University of Iowa alumni
American LGBT poets
American male short story writers
Yaddo alumni
Gay poets